Robert Jordan Hill was a British director, writer, editor and producer of films. He had a partnership with John Guillermin for a time.

Filmography

References

External links 

Robert Jordan Hill at IMDb
Robert Jordan Hill at BFI

British film directors